Uzi Shalev (born July 3, 1961) is an Israeli bassoonist.
Since 1987 he is assistant principal bassoonist with Israel Philharmonic Orchestra (IPO).

Early life 
On July 3, 1961, Shalev was born as Uzi Shalev in Kibbutz Ein-Dor, Israel. Son of Rafi and Ahuva Shalev.

Education 
Shalev studied the bassoon with Sara Tzur, Zeev Dorman, Walter Meroz and Mordechai Rechtman.
Upon completion of his military service in the IDF as an officer, he continued his studies at the Juilliard School in New York.

Career 
Since 1987, Shalev has been assistant principal bassoonist of the Israel Philharmonic Orchestra.

As first chair bassoonist with the IPO, Shalev has toured many of the major cities of North America, South America, Europe, the Far East and Australia, under the baton of Maestro Zubin Mehta, Maestro Lorin Maazel, Maestro Kurt Mazur, Maestro Gustavo Dudamel, Maestro Lahav Shani and other conductors.

Uzi Shalev is an active musician, who appears regularly with various chamber ensembles and performs as soloist with different orchestras, including the IPO.

Shalev's solo performances with the IPO
Uzi Shalev's solo performances with the IPO have included George Philip Telemann's
Double Concerto for Flute and Bassoon (1990), Joseph Haydn's Sinfonia Concertante (1998) and Aharon Harlap's Bassoon Concerto (2005), which was composed and dedicated for Mr. Shalev.

For this world premiere of Harlap's Concerto, Shalev won the Ödön Pártos Prize, from Israel's Minister of Culture, Science and Sports, for "best performance of an Israeli composition".

Recordings 
Uzi Shalev has recorded for radio, TV and compact discs.
His compact discs include:
Meridian CDE 84231
George Philip Telemann's Flute Sonatas (Meridian, 1993 - with flutist Yossi Arnheim - won the English Music Retailers Prize for "best chamber CD of 1993").
Meridian CDE 84359
Johann Christian Bach's Bassoon Concerto in E Flat Major (Bach×3, Meridian, 1998, with Capella Istropolitana of Bratislava and flutist Yossi Arnheim).
Romeo 7291/2
"The Phoenix" - music by composer Yehezkel Braun (Romeo Records, 2012), together with flutist Lior Eitan and pianist Rotem Luz. 
Meridian CDE 84637
In July 2015, his CD of Mozart's four flute quartets, arranged for bassoon and string trio by Mordechai Rechtman, was released in the UK. (Meridian, 2015).

Premieres 
Uzi Shalev has commissioned and premiered numerous compositions by distinguished Israeli composers,
among them Yehezkel Braun, Theodore Holdhaim, Ben-Zion Orgad, Tzvi Avni, Aharon Harlap, Arie Shapira, Ronn Yedidia, Tamar Muskal, Amit Poznansky, Eyal Bat, Ayala Asherov, and others.
The well-known bassoonist and arranger, Mordechai Rechtman, has dedicated a few of his arrangements to Uzi Shalev.

References

External links 
Uzi Shalev at the IPO site
 Merav Yudilevich, Winners of Ödön Pártos Prize 2005 declared March 15, 2006, Ynet
Noam Ben-Zeev, On "The Phoenix" Yehezkel Braun's new album February 21, 2013, Haaretz 
Profile of an IPO musician - Uzi Shalev
Yossi Schiffman On Aharon Harlap's Bassoon concerto January 18, 2005, Habama Israel culture portal
Faces of keynote - Uzi Shalev
Interview with Uzi Shalev, Assistant Principal Bassoon: Part 1
Interview with Uzi Shalev, Assistant Principal Bassoon: Part 2

Israeli classical musicians
Living people
1961 births
Israeli classical bassoonists